Agnes Walsh (born 1950) is a Canadian poet, playwright, actor and storyteller from Newfoundland and Labrador.

Born in Placentia, Newfoundland and Labrador, Walsh has won Newfoundland and Labrador Arts and Letters awards for poetry as well as TickleAce poetry and ballad writing awards. Her poems have been translated into French and Portuguese. She has toured Canada, the eastern United States, Portugal, and Ireland reading from her work.

Walsh is also the founder of the Tramore Theatre Troupe on the Cape Shore of Placentia Bay, an ensemble dedicated to preserving and presenting the oral history of that area. The group has performed to packed houses in both Newfoundland and Ireland and hosted Irish cultural exchanges to the Cape Shore area.

She has adapted Nobel Prize-winning Icelandic author Halldór Laxness's The Atom Station for the theatre.

In 2006, Walsh was named the first poet laureate of St. John's.

Bibliography
 In the Old Country of My Heart (1996)
 In the Old Country of My Heart audiobook edition (2003)
 Going Around with Bachelors (2007)
 Answer Me Home: Plays from Tramore Theatre (2011)
 Oderin (2018)

References

Canadian women poets
Writers from Newfoundland and Labrador
Canadian women dramatists and playwrights
1950 births
Living people
People from Placentia, Newfoundland and Labrador
20th-century Canadian dramatists and playwrights
21st-century Canadian dramatists and playwrights
20th-century Canadian poets
21st-century Canadian poets
20th-century Canadian women writers
21st-century Canadian women writers
Poets Laureate of places in Canada